Tenno Matsuri (天王祭り) is a festival held annually, in July, in Tsushima, Aichi. The highlight of the two-day event is the evening festival in which a dozen boats, each decorated with nearly 400 paper lanterns, float down the Tenno River.  The festival honors the deity Gozu Tenno. This festival also takes place in Tokyo.

External links

Gion/Tsushima Shinkō at Encyclopedia of Shinto
official site (in Japanese)

Festivals in Aichi Prefecture
Festivals in Tokyo
Summer events in Japan